The Redstone family of rockets consisted of a number of American ballistic missiles, sounding rockets and expendable launch vehicles operational during the 1950s and 1960s. The first member of the Redstone family was the PGM-11 Redstone missile, from which all subsequent variations of the Redstone were derived. The Juno 1 version of the Redstone launched Explorer 1, the first U.S. orbital satellite in 1958 and the Mercury-Redstone variation carried the first two U.S. astronauts into space in 1961. The rocket was named for the Redstone Arsenal in Huntsville, Alabama where it was developed.

PGM-11 Redstone
First launched in 1953, the PGM-11 Redstone was a short-range surface-to-surface ballistic missile in active service with the U.S. Army from June 1958 to June 1964; and was used for the first U.S. live nuclear missile tests. It was built by Chrysler for the United States Army Ballistic Missile Agency (ABMA) and was deployed in West Germany. George Huebner was the executive engineer in charge of Chrysler's missile program for its first two years of operation.

Jupiter-A
Jupiter-A was the first variant of Redstone, used to test components later used in the PGM-19 Jupiter medium-range ballistic missile.

Jupiter-C
Jupiter-C was a sounding rocket used for three sub-orbital spaceflights in 1956 and 1957. It was used as a testbed for re-entry vehicles later deployed on the PGM-19 Jupiter.

Juno I

Juno I was a derivative of the Jupiter-C, used to launch the first American satellite, Explorer 1, on January 31, 1958. Although the U.S. possibly could have put a satellite into orbit before the Soviet Union had the ABMA been allowed to attempt a satellite launch in August 1956, the Eisenhower administration wanted the first U.S. satellite to be launched by a civilian rocket developed by American engineers instead of a rocket derived from a military missile program and developed by the German engineers of Operation Paperclip. Additionally, the administration saw value in the USSR taking the first move to reach orbit because they would set the precedent that territorial overflight in space was fair game, necessary for the United States' space-based photoreconaissance ambitions in the wake of diplomatic protests against U-2 incursions of Soviet airspace.

The Vanguard launch vehicle was the civilian rocket program in development for this purpose, so the administration ordered ABMA's research director, Wernher von Braun, not to attempt any satellite launches. The Vanguard rocket failed on its first attempt to launch the Vanguard satellite in December 1957, crashing back to the pad and exploding. Following this setback and in the wake of the Sputnik crisis, the administration changed course and turned to the Army, asking ABMA and von Braun to launch the JPL-built satellite as soon as possible.

Mercury-Redstone
The Mercury-Redstone Launch Vehicle (MRLV), also known as Mercury-Redstone, used the stretched Redstone configuration from the Jupiter-C for six suborbital launches for Project Mercury in 1960 and 1961, including United States' first two human spaceflights:
 Mercury-Redstone 1, abort, traveled 
 Mercury-Redstone 1A, successful uncrewed flight
 Mercury-Redstone 2, carried Ham, a chimpanzee
 Mercury-Redstone BD, booster development – final test before crewed flight
 Mercury-Redstone 3 (Freedom 7), first American in space, Alan Shepard
 Mercury-Redstone 4 (Liberty Bell 7), second American in space, Gus Grissom

Saturn
Two members of the Saturn family of rockets, the Saturn I and IB, were derived from the Redstone. They used eight tanks built on Redstone tooling clustered around one propellant tank built on Jupiter missile tooling, and utilized eight Rocketdyne H-1 (Jupiter) engines to form the first stage of the rockets. First developed by the ABMA, the Saturn rocket was adopted by NASA for its Apollo program. America's first heavy-lift launch vehicles, the first of these was launched in 1961.

Sparta
Sparta was the name given to a series of surplus Redstone missiles with two solid-fuel upper stages launched as part of a joint US-UK research project with Australia from 1966 to 1967. Sparta launched Australia's first Earth satellite, WRESAT.

References
Notes

Bibliography
 

Medium-range ballistic missiles
Space launch vehicles of the United States
Sounding rockets of the United States
Expendable space launch systems

bg:Редстоун (ракета)
ca:Redstone (coet)
cs:Redstone
da:Redstone
de:Redstone (Rakete)
es:Redstone
fr:PGM-11 Redstone
it:PGM-11 Redstone
he:רדסטון (טיל)
no:Redstone (rakett)
pl:SSM-A-14 Redstone
pt:Redstone
sk:Redstone (balistická raketa)
fi:Redstone (raketti)
zh:紅石飛彈